KHNZ may refer to:

 Henderson–Oxford Airport (ICAO code KHNZ)
 KHNZ (FM), a radio station (101.3 FM) licensed to serve Lefors, Texas, United States